Ivan Samoylovych (died 1690) was the Hetman of Left-bank Ukraine from 1672 to 1687. His term in office was marked by further incorporation of the Cossack Hetmanate into the Tsardom of Russia and by attempts to win Right-bank Ukraine from Poland–Lithuania.

Public policy
Ivan Samoylovych first rose to prominence during Ivan Briukhovetsky's revolt against Tsardom of Russia. After Briukhovetsky's execution he supported Demian Mnohohrishny as a new hetman and swore allegiance to the Russian Tsar. Securing Mnohohrishny's deposition, he was elected the Hetman of the Left-Bank Ukraine in Konotop on 17 June 1672.

In public affairs, the ruler paid great attention to stabilization of internal situation in Ukraine. He took care of the expansion of the Ukrainian Mercenary army - serdiuk (Infantry) and companiskyi (Cavalry) regiments. He also contributed to the strengthening of the state elite. During the years of Samoilovich hetmanship, such a privileged group of the state elite as the Bunchuktovaryshi was introduced. Under subsequent hetmans, they became a source of personnel for public administration.

During Samoilovich's rule, Ukrainian lands were officially divided into the Left-bank Ukraine  and Right-bank Ukraine of the Dnieper River between the Polish–Lithuanian Commonwealth and the Moscow State (according to the Truce of Andrusovo of 1667). This division did not contribute to development of the country. And so the Right Bank Ukraine remained to be a scene of constant wars of neighboring states. Therefore, the Hetman decided to unite the Ukrainian lands. In 1674 he began a military campaign on the Right-bank Ukraine. The population there suffered from constant struggle and wanted to regain the right to live freely in their homeland. So a significant part of them met the hetman's army without resistance. Moreover, thanks to their support the supporters of the Polish king were unable to defeat Ivan Samoilovich.  Petro Doroshenko, the hetman of the Right-bank Ukraine, played a decisive role in this campaign. He voluntarily agreed in 1676 to give up his power in favor of Ivan Samoilovich. Then it was possible to overcome the split in public administration. Hetman's residence of Ivan Samoilovich was located in  Baturyn (modern Chernihiv region). And so at that time Baturyn received the status of the only Administrative centre of the Ukrainian Cossack state.

This reunion also needed international recognition. Therefore, in 1681 Hetman Samoilovich became one of the initiators of the Treaty of   Bakhchysarai between the Turkish sultan and the Crimean Khanate on the one hand and the Moscow State on the other. According to the treaty the fate of part of the Ukrainian lands was determined.

As for the Hetman domestic policy, he paid great attention to the Metropolitanate of Kyiv, which was the center of fostering of the national idea of the existence of the  Ukrainian state, and the center of unity of the Ukrainian people. Ivan Samoilovich actively maintained close relations with the leaders of the Orthodox Church of Ukraine, received assistance from them in resolving various state issues. The hetman also sought support for the Ukrainian state and among the centers of world Orthodoxy. For example, Ivan Samoilovich was one of the first Ukrainian rulers who provided charitable assistance for the construction of the monastery of Zograf Bulgarian monastery of Zograf on Mount Athos. Furthermore, during the second half of the seventeenth century, Hetman Ivan Samoilovich initiated active church building in the Ukrainian lands. With his support, the construction of theTrinity Cathedral, the main church of the Hetman's capital, was completed in Baturyn. Grandiose church construction at this time was also carried out in other cities of Ukraine, such as Hlukhiv, Poltava, Lubny and Chernihiv.

In general, his contemporaries described him as the ruler of the wise and intelligent, who had a knack of military command and diplomacy.

Honoring the hetman
Author Igor Zarichnyi, 2003. 
 The monument to Ivan Samoilovich in Baturyn called . Authors Bogdan and Mykola Mazury. 2009. 
 The Ivan Samoilovich Street in Baturyn.
 The Ivan Samoilovich Street in Zaporizhzhia.

Conflict with Golitsyn
In 1679 Poland invited Vasily Golitsyn (prime-minister of Russia) to join the Holy League against the Turks. The Eternal Peace Treaty between Poland and Russia ran contrary with Samoylovych's plans to annex the right bank of the Dnieper, which still remained under Polish dominion since the Treaty of Andrusovo. Samoylovych attempted to persuade Russian boyars in the Polish treachery but, failing in his design, sent an angry letter to the king of Poland. Despite subsequent apologies, this incident would eventually contribute to his downfall.

In 1687, Golitsyn and Samoylovych failed in their Crimean campaigns against the Crimean Khanate on account of steppe fires. It was rumoured that it was Samoylovych who had set the steppe on fire, because he preferred the Tatars to the Poles. Golitsyn, meanwhile, was exasperated at Samoylovych's friendship with Prince Romodanovsky, his old political rival, and finally resolved to replace him with a more tractable Cossack.

In June 1687, Ivan Mazepa used the popular discontent with Samoylovych's haughty manners and high taxes to accuse him of separatism. Thereupon his youngest son, Hryhory Samoylovych, was incriminated in slandering the Tsar and executed in Sevsk. The old hetman and his family were arrested and exiled to Tobolsk in Siberia, where he died in 1690.

See also
 Gedeon (Svyatopolk-Chetvertynsky)

References

External links
 
 Ivan Samoilovych at Encyclopedia of Ukraine

1630s births
1690 deaths
Year of birth uncertain
People from Zhytomyr Oblast
People from Kiev Voivodeship
Hetmans of Zaporizhian Host
Colonels of the Cossack Hetmanate
Judges General of the Cossack Hetmanate
Ukrainian exiles in the Russian Empire